Delhi High School is a public high school in Delhi, California. It is located in Merced County. It has been established since 1998. It is apart of Delhi Unified School District, which is a K-12 rural school district along with these schools: Schendel Elementary, Harmony Elementry, El Capitain Elementary, and Delhi Middle School. It has been active with the program Future Farmers of America (FFA) since 2016, and has been invited to multiple National Events.

Statistics

Demographics

SAT performance

Student activities

Athletics 
Athletics include: baseball, boys and girls soccer, boys and girls basketball, cheerleading, cross country, football, softball, tennis, track, volleyball, and wrestling.

References

External links
 

High schools in Merced County, California
Public high schools in California